Nakazukh is a rural locality (a selo) in Sogratlinsky Selsoviet, Gunibsky District, Republic of Dagestan, Russia. The population was 136 as of 2010.

Geography 
Nakazukh is located 31 km southwest of Gunib (the district's administrative centre) by road, on the Batikh River. Batsada and Shulani are the nearest rural localities.

References 

Rural localities in Gunibsky District